The Radiation Belt and Magnetosphere is a book written by Wilmot Hess in 1968. The intention of the book is to amalgamate and sift through some 2500 articles, written since 1960, on this topic.

See also
Magnetosphere
Van Allen radiation belt

Notes

1968 non-fiction books
Physics books